Snehicha Kuttathinu is a 1985 Indian Malayalam-language film,  directed by P. K. Joseph and produced by T. K. Balachandran. The film stars Prem Nazir, Ratheesh, Santhosh and Shubha. The film has musical score by A. T. Ummer.

Cast

Prem Nazir as Mohandas 
Ratheesh as Rajendran 
Santhosh as Vinod
Shubha as Saraswathi
Soumya (actress) as Ramani
Prathapachandran as Krishna Pilla
Aruna as Sulochana
M. G. Soman as Sudhakaran
Poojappura Ravi as Ramunni Ashan
Santhakumari as Kausalya
Seema as Yamuna
Sreenath as Satheesh Chandran 
Sumithra as Sumathi
T. G. Ravi as Kuttan nair
T. K. Balachandran as Advocate

Soundtrack
The music was composed by A. T. Ummer and the lyrics were written by Mankombu Gopalakrishnan.

References

External links
 

1985 films
1980s Malayalam-language films